Domnica Rădulescu is a Romanian-born American writer of novels, plays and books of literary criticism. She is the author of three novels: Train to Trieste (Knopf, 2008), Black Sea Twilight (Transworld, 2010)  and Country of Red Azaleas (Twelve, Hachette Group, 2016). She has also authored numerous books and edited collections on theater, east European literature, exile literature, representations of women and humor.

Two of her plays, The Town with Very Nice People (2013) and Exile Is My Home (2014) were finalists for the Jane Chambers Playwriting Award, Exile Is My Home was presented as a staged reading at TheaterLab off Broadway  and was staged as a full production at the Theater for the New City in April 2016.  She is a Fulbright scholar and the founding director of the National Symposium of Theater in Academe.

She has been reviewed by multiple publications for her books.

Works

Fiction

Country of Red Azaleas,  a novel. New York: Twelve, an imprint of the Hachette Group, April 2016.
 Black Sea Twilight,  a novel, London, UK, Toronto, Canada: Doubleday Publishing, April 2010 & August 2011.
 Train to Trieste , a novel. New York: Knopf, 2008 and 2009; London, UK: Transworld 2008 and 2009, and twelve international editions: Editions Belfond in France, Hoffmann und Campe in Germany, Frassinelli in Italy, Zamora Publishing in Israel, Editorial Elephas in Mexico among them.  Train to Trieste received rave reviews in the United States and abroad.

Plays 
 Dos obras dramáticas. , a collection of two plays, Exile is my home - a sci-fi Immigrant fairytale and The Virgins of Seville - an immigrant fantasy, in a bilingual Spanish English edition.  Estudio introductorio y traducción de Catalina Iliescu Gheorghiu.
 Exile is my Home : Four plays by Domnica Radulescu. . Scholar Christine Evans says 'Radulescu’s plays are carnivalesque, grotesquely comic, savagely sad and breath-taking in their imaginative scope. They bound over oceans, continents, planets, stifling small-town faculty meetings and the terrifying liminal spaces of the US border.'  A NoPassport Press publication.

Memoir 

 Dream in a Suitcase. ISBN 978-1649795403, a fast-paced journey of survival, resilience, and the power of love. It is the first English language memoir of a female Romanian-American survivor of the worst communist dictatorship behind the Iron Curtain. Published by  ‎ Austin Macauley (December 2021).

Anthology 
 Voices on the Move: , An Anthology by and about Refugees. Edited by Domnica Radulescu and Roxana Cazana. A multi-genre collection of diverse artistic works ranging from poetry to creative fiction and non-fiction, from drama to photography inspired by the multilayered experience of displacement. Solis Press, 2020.

Literary Criticism 

 Theater of War and Exile. Twelve Playwrights, Directors and Performers from Eastern Europe and Israel.   McFarland Publishing, 2015.
 Women’s Comedic Art as Social Revolution. Five Performers and the Lessons of Their Subversive Humor. McFarland Publishing, 2011.
 “Gypsies in European Literature and Culture,’ co-ed. with Valentina Glajar, Palgrave Macmillan Publishing, 2008 (refereed).
 The Theater of Teaching and the Lessons of Theater, co-ed. Lanham, MD: Rowman & Littlefield Publishing, co-ed., 2005
 Vampirettes, Wretches, and Amazons. Western Representations of East European Women, co-ed. With Valentina Glajar. New York: Columbia University Press, East European Monograph Series, 2004.
 Realms of Exile. Nomadism, Diasporas and Eastern European Voices, editor Lanham, MD:Rowman & Littlefield, Lexington Books, 2002.
 Sisters of Medea. The Tragic Heroine across Cultures. University Press of the South, 2002.
 André Malraux: The "Farfelu" as Expression of the Feminine and the Erotic. New York, Paris: Peter Lang Publishing, 1994.
 André Malraux et la Diversité Culturelle, co-ed. with Jean-Claude Larrat, Revue des Lettres Modernes. Paris: Minard, 2004.

Awards
 Honorable Mention – the Jane Chambers Playwriting Award – for the original play Exile Is My Home. An Immigrant Fairytale, June 2014
 Second Prize—the Jane Chambers Playwriting Award - for the original play The Town with Very Nice People. A Strident Operetta, June 2013 (chosen out of 114 play submissions) 
 Outstanding Faculty Award from the State Council of Higher Education for Virginia, 2011
 Library of Virginia Best Fiction Award for Train to Trieste, 2009
 Fulbright Lecturing-Research Fellowship to Romania, Theater Department, Babes-Bolyai University, fall 2007.
 Fulbright Lecturing-Research Fellowship to Romania, University of Bucharest (2017–18).

References

20th-century Romanian women writers
21st-century Romanian novelists
Living people
1961 births
20th-century Romanian novelists
20th-century American women writers
20th-century American writers
21st-century American writers
Romanian emigrants to the United States
Washington and Lee University faculty
21st-century American women writers
21st-century Romanian women writers
Romanian women novelists